The Chevrolet 210 or Two-Ten is a midrange car from Chevrolet that was marketed from 1953 until 1957. It took its name by shortening the production series number 2100 by one digit in order to capitalize on the 1950s trend toward numerical auto names.  The numerical designation "210" was also sporadically used in company literature. It replaced the Styleline DeLuxe model available in previous years. The 210 was discontinued after the 1957 model year to be replaced by the Biscayne.

History 
The Two-Ten series, introduced for the 1953 model year, replaced the Styleline DeLuxe series.  It was actually the best-selling Chevrolet model during 1953 and 54, offering a balance of style and luxury appointments unavailable in the base 150 series, but was less costly than the glitzy Bel Air.  Two-Tens offered the widest choice of body styles for 1953, including a convertible, Sport Coupe hardtop, two- and four-door sedans, and four-door station wagons.

As the American public began to prefer posh to economy, the Bel Air began to outsell the lesser series, including both 150 and 210 models.  As a partial answer to this, Chevrolet re-introduced the Two-Ten Sport Coupe hardtop in the middle of the 1955 model year, and also added a four-door Two-Ten hardtop Sport Sedan for 1956.  Neither achieved the sales of their Bel Air counterparts, however, since they were only about $100.00 cheaper than the Bel Airs, which provided more luxury and premium exterior trim.

Unlike the 150 series, Two-Tens were always available with the same luxury options as the Bel Air, including the Powerglide automatic transmission, power window lifts and seat adjuster.  The Two-Ten Townsman was the top station wagon model offered in 1953, but the Townsman was moved up to the Bel Air series for 1954, only to return to the Two-Ten for 1955. The lower-priced Handyman station wagon, a four-door model in 1953–54, became a two-door for 1955–57. Both were joined by a nine-passenger Beauville four-door wagon in 1956–57.

First generation (1953–1954)

1953–1954 models 
First years for the Two-Ten. These model years are essentially the same except for minor front and rear trim items, and of course the reduced model offering in 1954.  Turn signal indicators on 1953 dashboards were white, green in 1954.

Powertrains 

Two engines were used in each of the 1953-54 model years, the more powerful Blue Flame unit used with the Powerglide automatic transmission.  All Two-Tens had a three-speed Synchromesh manual transmission as standard, with two optional transmissions (see below).  All engines are of the overhead valve (OHV) design.  They are commonly referred to as "Stovebolt Sixes" because of the large slotted-head screws used to fasten the valve cover and pushrod covers to the block.  1954 was the last year for 6 volt electrical systems in Chevrolet vehicles.

Transmissions 
 3-speed Synchromesh manual
 3-speed Synchromesh manual with overdrive unit
 2-speed Powerglide automatic.

Second generation (1955–1957)

1955 
The 1955 model year marks the introduction of a new chassis and the debut of the small block V8. The center door frame was beefed up for more safety. Brakes were  drums. The Two-Ten buyer was free to choose any powertrain option available. The ammeter and oil pressure gauges were changed to warning lights.

This was not the first Chevrolet to have a V8 engine installed. The first Chevrolet with a V8 engine was introduced in 1917 called the Series D which was built for two years, and was manufactured before Chevrolet joined General Motors.

Engines 

Transmissions 
 3-speed Synchromesh manual
 3-speed Synchromesh manual with overdrive unit
 2-speed Powerglide automatic.

1956 

Engine choices remain the same except they were now rated with higher power output. The  V8 was available in three versions. The I6 had a new unified build no matter the transmission.

Engines 
 265 in3 "Turbo-Fire" OHV V8 with quad barrel carburetor rated at 
 265 in3 "Turbo-Fire" OHV V8 with dual-quad barrel carburetors rated at

Transmissions 
 3-speed Synchromesh manual
 3-speed Synchromesh manual with overdrive unit
 2-speed Powerglide automatic

1957 
New for 1957 was the optional  small-block V8 engine. There were three versions of this engine with conventional carburetors, as well as a fuel injected option.

The Two-Ten shared the wedge-shaped side trim with the Bel Air, but unlike the Bel Air (which had the wedge filled with an aluminum trim panel) the Two-Ten's wedge was painted either body color, or top color with the optional two-tone paint package.  "Chevrolet" in script was mounted inside the wedge.

Engines 
 283 in3 "Super Turbo-Fire" OHV V8 with 4 barrel carburetor rated at 
 283 in3 "Super Turbo-Fire" OHV V8 with dual 4 barrel carburetors rated at 
 283 in3 "Super Turbo-Fire" OHV V8 with Rochester Ram-Jet fuel injection rated at

Transmissions 
 3-speed Synchromesh manual
 3-speed Synchromesh manual with overdrive unit
 2-speed Powerglide automatic
 Turboglide variable-speed automatic

Today 
Today, the Bel Air series of Chevrolets from 1953 to 1957 are far and away the most desirable models for collectors.  However, Two-Ten models do have appeal, especially the 1953 convertible (very rare), the Del Ray Club Coupe with its upgraded vinyl interior, and the Sport Coupe hardtops of 1953 and 1955-57.  Other models are less valuable, but again, can be purchased for less money than Bel Airs, for Chevrolet collectors on a budget.  Unlike the One-Fifty series, Two-Tens do sport a fair amount of chrome trim and de luxe interior appointments, making them attractive and comfortable.

See also
 1950s American automobile culture
 Chevrolet 150
 Chevrolet Bel Air
 Chevrolet Nomad
 Tri-Five

References 

Cars introduced in 1953
210
Motor vehicles manufactured in the United States
1950s cars